The Germany cricket team toured Spain in September 2021 to play a three-match Twenty20 International (T20I) series at the Desert Springs Cricket Ground in Almería. The two sides last met at the same venue in March 2020, when a two-match series was shared 1–1. Germany used the series to help with their preparations for the T20 World Cup Europe Qualifier that was played in Spain in October 2021. Germany won the first T20I match, with Spain then winning the remaining matches to win the series 2–1.

Squads

T20I series

1st T20I

2nd T20I

3rd T20I

References

External links
 Series home at ESPNcricinfo

Associate international cricket competitions in 2021